Rudolf Gyger (16 April 1920 – 1996) was a Swiss football defender who played for Switzerland in the 1950 FIFA World Cup. He also played for Neuchâtel Xamax.

References

1920 births
1996 deaths
Swiss men's footballers
Switzerland international footballers
Association football defenders
Neuchâtel Xamax FCS players
1950 FIFA World Cup players